The Masonic Temple was a historic building in Riverside, California.  Constructed in the Classical Revival style in 1908, it served as a Masonic Hall for two local Masonic Lodges. When the Masons moved to new premises in 1955, the building was purchased by Riverside county.

It was listed on the National Register of Historic Places in 1980. It was demolished in 1988 to make way for the new Riverside County Hall of Justice.

References

Buildings and structures in Riverside, California
Former Masonic buildings in California
Masonic buildings completed in 1908
Clubhouses on the National Register of Historic Places in California
National Register of Historic Places in Riverside County, California
Neoclassical architecture in California
1908 establishments in California
Demolished buildings and structures in California
Buildings and structures demolished in 1988